The Sambalpur–Jammu Tawi Express is an Express train belonging to East Coast Railway zone that runs between  and  in India. It is currently being operated with 18109/18110 train numbers on a daily basis.

Service

The 18109/Sambalpur–Jammu Tawi Express has an average speed of 43 km/hr and covers 2304.3 km in  54h 25m. The 18110/Jammu Tawi–Sambalpur Express has an average speed of 45 km/hr and covers 2304.3 km in 51h 25m.

Route and halts 

The important halts of the train are:

 
 
 
 
 
 
 
 
 
 
 
 
 Garwa Road Junction railway station
 
 
 
 
 
 
 
 Old 
 
 
 Phillaur Junction
 Phagwara Junction

Coach composition

The train has standard ICF rakes with a max speed of 110 kmph. The train consists of 22 coaches:

 1 AC II Tier
 1 AC III Tier
 6 Sleeper coaches
 1 Pantry car
 2 General Unreserved
 2 Seating cum Luggage Rake

Traction

Both trains are hauled by a Tatanagar Loco Shed-based WAP-7 electric locomotive from Sambalpur to Chopan. From Chopan trains are hauled by a Patratu Loco Shed-based WDM-3A diesel locomotive uptil Chunar. From Chunar trains are hauled by a Kanpur Loco Shed-based WAP-4 electric locomotive uptil Amritsar. From Amritsar trains are hauled by a Ludhiana Loco Shed-based WDM-3A diesel locomotive uptil Pathankot. From Pathankot trains are hauled by a Ghaziabad Loco Shed-based WAP-4 electric locomotive uptil Jammu, and vice versa.

Rake sharing

Direction reversal

The train reverses its direction 2 times:

See also 

 Phillaur Junction
 Rourkela Junction railway station
 Jammu Tawi railway station
 Tatanagar–Amritsar Jallianwalla Bagh Express
 Muri Express

Notes

References

External links 

 18109/Rourkela–Jammu Tawi Express
 18110/Jammu Tawi–Rourkela Express

Transport in Rourkela
Transport in Jammu
Express trains in India
Rail transport in West Bengal
Rail transport in Jharkhand
Rail transport in Uttar Pradesh
Rail transport in Bihar
Rail transport in Haryana
Rail transport in Punjab, India
Rail transport in Jammu and Kashmir
Railway services introduced in 2003